"Headful of Ghosts" is a 2001 song by the British band Bush from their fourth album Golden State. It was released as the second American single on 25 November 2001.

Music video
No music video was made for the single, however a live performance of the song was used as a music video to promote the single.

Chart positions

References

2001 singles
Bush (British band) songs
Songs written by Gavin Rossdale
Song recordings produced by Dave Sardy
2001 songs
Atlantic Records singles